Gallella gama  is a village in Sri Lanka. It is located within Kandy, Central Province.

See also
List of towns in Central Province, Sri Lanka
Kandy
Matale
Nuwara Eliya

External links

Populated places in Central Province, Sri Lanka